The Stuart Collection is a collection of public art on the campus of the University of California San Diego. Founded in 1981, the Stuart Collection's goal is to spread commissioned sculpture throughout the campus, including both traditional sculptures and site-specific works integrating with features of the campus such as landscaping and buildings. It is supported by the UCSD Department of Visual Arts, the National Endowment for the Arts, and many private organizations and individuals.

The collection was conceived by and named after its initial benefactor, James Stuart DeSilva. Since its creation, it has been administered by Director Mary L. Beebe. It contains nineteen works, with numerous others planned that have not or never will come to fruition. The first work added to the collection was Niki de Saint Phalle's Sun God, and the most recent addition is Mark Bradford's What Hath God Wrought?

Installations

References

External links

Stuart Collection Web Site
Stuart Collection. Records RSS 1250. Special Collections & Archives, UC San Diego Library.

 
Outdoor sculptures in San Diego
University of California, San Diego
1983 establishments in California
Art museums established in 1983
Culture of San Diego